RFC Seraing is a Belgian association football club based in Seraing in the province of Liège. They play their home games at the Stade du Pairay.

History
The club was founded in the early 20th century as RFC Bressoux, registered with the Belgian FA under matricule 23, but renamed in 1992 to Royale Union Liégeoise or RUL after a merger. Upon the default of R.F.C. Seraing in 1996, the club again renamed itself to Seraing RUL and started playing at the Stade du Pairay where the former RFC Seraing played until its default. It was however an entirely different club and completely distinct from the former RFC Seraing. Seraing RUL was at that level playing at the fourth level of Belgian football. The club would remain at the lower levels of Belgian football, never higher than the third level. It 2006, this club changed its name to RFC Seraing to recapture the past of the club which place it took, but dropped further, even sinking to the fifth level in 2014, at which point it bought the rights (and place) of another club (Boussu Dour Borinage) to swap places. As a result, the club now carried matricule 167 (as 23 now belonged to Boussu Dour Borinage) and was able to immediately jump three levels and started the 2014–15 season in the Belgian Second Division. It started in the Second Division under the new name Seraing United, but reverted to RFC Seraing one season later. With the Belgian league reform of 2016, the club dropped back to the third level, but managed to promote two times in succession in 2019–20 and 2020–21 to reach the 2021–22 Belgian First Division A, bringing back top division football to the city of Seraing after 25 years.

Honours 

 Belgian Second Division: 2
 1981–82, 1992–93

Players

Current squad

Out on loan

}

Club officials

References

External links
 

R.F.C. Seraing (1922)
Association football clubs established in 1922
1922 establishments in Belgium
Seraing
Belgian Pro League clubs